The following is a list of countries which Ukraine has established diplomatic relations with. Ukraine began moving towards independence from the Soviet Union with the Declaration of State Sovereignty of Ukraine on 16 July, 1990. The ratification of Act of Declaration of Independence of Ukraine on 24 August, 1991, by the Verkhovna Rada reestablished Ukrainian independence after the 1941 declaration of independence.

Two days after the 1991 Ukrainian independence referendum, neighboring Hungary became the first country to establish diplomatic relations with Ukraine on 3 December, 1991, and Ukraine has since then established diplomatic relations with 182 of the 193 United Nations member countries, the Holy See and the Sovereign Order of Malta.

By 2019, Ukraine had not suspended any diplomatic relations but relations with Russia and Syria were only nominal. Diplomatic relations with Russia were eventually cut on 24 February, 2022, as a response to the 2022 Russian invasion of Ukraine. Diplomatic relations with Syria were cut on 30 June, 2022. Diplomatic relations with North Korea were cut on 13 July, 2022.

Chronological list

No relations
Sovereign states which do not maintain diplomatic relations with Ukraine:

 (Since 13 July 2022)

 (Since 24 February 2022)

 (Since 30 June 2022)

See also
 Foreign relations of Ukraine

References

Foreign relations of Ukraine
Diplomatic relations